Rashad Muhammad al-Alimi (born 15 January 1954) is a Yemeni politician currently serving as the chairman of the Presidential Leadership Council since 7 April 2022.

Biography 
Rashad al-Alimi was born on January 15, 1954, in Al-Aloom, a village in the Taiz Governorate, and is the son of judge Mohammed ben Ali al-Alimi. He graduated from Gamal Abdel Nasser High School in Sanaa in 1969. He subsequently obtained a bachelor's degree in military science from the Kuwait Police College in 1975, and another university degree in arts from the University of Sanaa in 1977, then a master's degree and a doctorate in sociology from Ain Shams University in Egypt between 1984 and 1988.

A member of the General People's Congress, he was Minister of the Interior from 4 April 2001 to 2008. He then became Chairman of the Supreme Security Committee and Deputy Prime Minister in charge of Defense and Security Affairs in May 2008, subsequently becoming a member of the Yemeni National Dialogue Conference, then adviser to President Abdrabbuh Mansur Hadi in 2014.

On 3 June 2011, during the Battle of Sanaa, al-Alimi was wounded along with Ali Abdullah Saleh during an attack on the Al-Nahdin Mosque in the Presidential Palace. He was subsequently transferred to Saudi Arabia and to Germany for treatment, before returning to Sanaa on 13 June 2012. He left the city again as a result of the Houthi takeover in Yemen and began living in Saudi Arabia in 2015.

Al-Alimi became Chairman of the Presidential Leadership Council, a body given the powers of the President of Yemen, on 7 April 2022, through a decree by President Hadi, who irreversibly transferred his powers to the council. Multiple sources in the Yemeni and Saudi governments stated that Saudi Arabia, where Hadi was living, forced him to cede power to Alimi.

References 

1954 births
Living people
General People's Congress (Yemen) politicians
Presidents of Yemen
People from Taiz Governorate
Presidential Leadership Council
21st-century Yemeni politicians
Interior ministers of Yemen
Local administration ministers of Yemen
Sanaa University alumni